Alan Loader Maffey, 2nd Baron Rugby (16 April 1913 - 12 January 1990) was a British peer.

Life
Alan Loader Maffey was the son of John Maffey, 1st Baron Rugby, who was Governor-General of the Sudan and a key player in Anglo-Irish relations during World War II. He was educated at Stowe School in Buckinghamshire, England. He fought in the Second World War, gaining the rank of Flight Lieutenant in the Royal Auxiliary Air Force. He married Margaret Bindley, daughter of Harold Bindley, on 14 April 1947. He succeeded as the 2nd Baron Rugby, of Rugby, co. Warwick on 20 April 1969, following the death of his father.

Personal life
Lord Rugby had several children with his wife Margaret Bindley.
 Hon. John Richard Maffey b. 28 Aug 1949, d. 1981
 Rt Hon. Robert Charles Maffey, 3rd Baron Rugby b. 4 May 1951
 Hon. Selina Penelope Maffey b. 15 Nov 1952
 Hon. Christopher Alan Maffey b. 20 Feb 1955
 Hon. Mark Andrew Maffey b. 7 Jun 1956
 Hon. Alicia Dorothy Maffey b. 14 Jan 1960

Arms of Alan Loader Maffey, 2nd Baron Maffey

References 

Barons in the Peerage of the United Kingdom
Place of birth missing
1913 births
1990 deaths
Royal Air Force personnel of World War II
Royal Air Force officers
People educated at Stowe School